Forky Asks a Question is a television series of American computer-animated short films produced by Pixar based on the Toy Story franchise, set after Toy Story 4. It is the third Pixar short series, following the Cars Toons and Toy Story Toons. The series focuses on the character of Forky (voiced by Tony Hale) as he asks his friends different questions about life. The series aired from November 12, 2019 to January 10, 2020, on Disney+.
Clancy Brown reprised his role of the Big Bad Wolf, as well as the Big Bad Wolf’s first Pixar Animation Studios TV series.

Premise
Set sometime after the events of Toy Story 4, handmade toy Forky asks his friends (the characters of the Toy Story franchise) different questions about life.

Cast and characters
 Tony Hale as Forky, a homemade toy who, having been recently created, asks his friends questions about life.
 John Ratzenberger as Hamm, a piggy bank.
 Wallace Shawn as Rex, a toy tyrannosaurus rex.
 Kristen Schaal as Trixie, a toy triceratops.
 Carol Burnett as Chairol Burnett, a toy chair, whom Bonnie used to play with.
 Mel Brooks as Melephant Brooks, a toy elephant, whom Bonnie used to play with.
 Carl Reiner as Carl Reineroceros, a toy rhino, whom Bonnie used to play with. This was Reiner's last time reprising this role, before his death in June 2020.
 Betty White as Bitey White, a toy tiger, whom Bonnie used to play with. This was White's last time reprising this role, as well as her final television role, before her death in December 2021. 
 Robin Atkin Downes as Mr. Pricklepants, a stuffed hedgehog toy, with a fascination with acting and theater. Downes replaces Timothy Dalton, who voiced the character in previous media of Toy Story.
 Alan Oppenheimer as Old Timer, a toy alarm clock, with the face of an old man.
 Aloma Wright as Rib Tickles, a toy dog Pet Patrol officer. A male version of the character was originally set to appear in Toy Story 4, though it was ultimately deleted.
 Bonnie Hunt as Dolly, one of Bonnie’s most beloved toys, and the leader of them.
 Jeff Garlin as Buttercup, a toy unicorn.
 Addison Andrews, Mika Crespo and Imani Prior as Peas in a Pod, a toy version of actual peas in a pod.
 Jeff Pidgeon as Mr. Spell, a toy with a built in keyboard, who speaks words that are typed in.
 Clancy Brown as the Big Bad Wolf

Episodes
All episodes were directed and written by Bob Peterson.

Production

Development
On Disney+ Investor Day 2019, Pixar's chief creative officer, Pete Docter, revealed that a new series of shorts, based on Toy Story 4s Forky, titled Forky Asks a Question, was in development for Disney+, with Tony Hale set to reprise his role from Toy Story 4. Hale said that the series is about "these questions that maybe people are embarrassed maybe to ask, but they really don't know". Bob Peterson wrote and directed the series, and was produced by producer of Toy Story 4, Mark Nielsen. 

The series is produced at Pixar Animation Studios.

Casting
On June 12, 2019, when the series was announced, it was confirmed that Tony Hale would reprise his role from Toy Story 4 in the series. On June 18, Hale revealed during an interview that he already recorded his lines as Forky for the series. A week later, Nielsen revealed that Carol Burnett, Mel Brooks, Carl Reiner and Betty White would reprise their roles from Toy Story 4, as Chairol Burnett, Melephant Brooks, Carl Reineroceros, and Bitey White, respectively, during the series. Nielsen said the characters have "considerable screen time" compared to their appearances in the film. 

During the D23, of August 2019, it was revealed that John Ratzenberger would reprise his role as Hamm in the series. On October 30, 2019, Wallace Shawn and Kristen Schaal were revealed to be reprising their roles as Rex and Trixie, respectively.

Music
Jake Monaco composed the series' score. Monaco said that "Forky's character is so animated ... There are so many movements and facial expressions and the voice acting that Tony Hale does is just incredible. He is enough to carry any scene by himself". He also said that director Bob Peterson "wanted the music to simply disappear into the background", to which he gave the score "a little bit of a jazz vibe". 

A soundtrack for the series' first season, featuring Monaco's score, and two tracks written by Monaco and Toby Sherriff, was released on February 28, 2020.

Release
Forky Asks a Question was released on November 12, 2019, on Disney+. The series consists of ten episodes released weekly, with each episode being 3 to 4 minutes long. A clip from the series was shown at the D23 August 2019. The series' first trailer was released on October 30, 2019.

Reception

Critical response 
On Rotten Tomatoes, the series holds an approval rating of 83%, based on twelve reviews, with an average rating of 7.95/10. Its critical consensus reads, “Short and sweet, Forky Asks a Question is fun and funny enough to work for fans.” On Metacritic, the series has a weighted average score of 64 out of 100, based on five critics, indicating “generally favourable reviews.”

Joel Keller of Decider praised the humor of the series, acclaimed the quality of the animation, and found that the script manages to be entertaining for both adults and kids. David Griffin of IGN rated the first episode of the series 9 out of 10, found the show to be very amusing and educational, stated that the animation reaches the level of Pixar's theatrical movies, and praised the performance of Tony Hale as Forky. Emily Ashby of Common Sense Media rated the show 4 out of 5 stars, stating: "Forky Asks a Question centers on the breakout star character of Toy Story 4 as he ponders the big questions about the world and how it works. Each of the 10 short episodes sees one of his toy friends helping Forky learn things like what it means to be a friend, what defines art, and what time is. Forky absorbs information at a preschooler's pace, which means his focus changes a lot and he gets distracted at times, but he always manages to sum up the main point succinctly and thoughtfully. This hilarious extension of a beloved character is a must-see for Forky fans of all ages".

Accolades

References

External links

 
 

Pixar short films
Toy Story
Animated film series
Disney short film series
Television series by Pixar
Disney animated television series
2019 American television series debuts
2020 American television series endings
2010s American animated television series
2020s American animated television series
American animated television spin-offs
American children's animated comedy television series
American computer-animated television series
Animated television shows based on films
Disney+ original programming
Emmy Award-winning programs